Highway 942 is a provincial highway in the north-west region of the Canadian province of Saskatchewan. It runs from Highway 55 near Bodmin until it downgrades into a local road bound for Roberts Lake. Highway 943 is about 56 km (35 mi) long.

Highway 942 passes near the town of Big River, and also intersects Highway 943.

See also 
Roads in Saskatchewan
Transportation in Saskatchewan

References 

942